Michele Pellegrino (25 April 1903 – 10 October 1986) was an Italian cardinal of the Roman Catholic Church who served as Archbishop of Turin from 1965 until 1977.

Biography
Pellegrino was born in Centallo near Fossano. He was educated at the Seminary of Fossano, Catholic University of Milan, and the Theological Faculty in Turin. He was ordained on 19 September 1925 in Fossano. After his ordination he served as spiritual director of the Seminary of Fossano from 1929 until 1933. He was Canon of the cathedral chapter of Fossano, vicar general and vicar capitular of the diocese between 1933 and 1943. He taught early Christian literature as a faculty member of the University of Turin until 1965.

Episcopate
Pope Paul VI appointed him Archbishop of Turin on 18 September 1965. As a bishop he was present at the last session of the Second Vatican Council in 1965.

Cardinalate 
He was created Cardinal-Priest of Santissimo Nome di Gesù by Pope Paul on 26 June 1967. He resigned the government of the archdiocese in 1977. He participated in the conclaves that elected Pope John Paul I and Pope John Paul II. He died three years later and is buried in his family plot in the parish church of Roata Chiusani.

References

	

1903 births
1986 deaths
20th-century Italian cardinals
Archbishops of Turin
20th-century Italian Roman Catholic archbishops
Participants in the Second Vatican Council
Cardinals created by Pope Paul VI